The Oregon State University Radiation Center (OSURC) is a research facility that houses a nuclear reactor at Oregon State University (OSU) in Corvallis, Oregon, United States. The Oregon State TRIGA Reactor (OSTR) serves the research needs of the OSU nuclear engineering department along with other departments (notably medical applications).

About 70% of the research projects at the OSU Radiation Center use the reactor.

Reactor overview

The radiation center is located on the west side of the OSU campus, across the street from the Environmental Protection Agency (EPA) offices and about half a mile from Reser Stadium.

The reactor is a Mark II TRIGA reactor with a maximum thermal output of 1.1 MW and can be pulsed up to a power of 3000 MW for a very short time.  The fuel is low enriched uranium.  Operation began in 1967.

The reactor supported 96 academic courses in 1999. These courses were in chemistry, civil engineering, chemical engineering, geosciences, oceanography and atmospheric sciences, bioresource engineering, honors college and naval engineering disciplines.

The OSU Radiation center supported 126 projects in 2000 with 69% directly involving use of the OSTR.  Contracts supporting these projects in 2000 totaled $3 million.

The mission statement of the center is
To serve as the campus wide teaching, research, and service facility for programs involving the use of ionizing radiation and radioactive materials.

Thermal column
The thermal column is a large graphite slab that pierces the concrete bioshield of the reactor and makes contact with the graphite neutron reflector surrounding the core. The purpose of the thermal column is to create an irradiation facility that filters out high energy neutrons to create a high thermal neutron flux. The thermal column is primarily used for fission tracking of certain minerals that contain fissile material.

In-Core Irradiation Facilities
OSTR has six in-core irradiation facilities:

The Cadmium-Lined In-Core Irradiation Tube (or CLICIT) is a vacuum-filled irradiation facility occupying a fuel slot in the central area of the core. Cadmium is a thermal neutron absorber, allowing only epithermal neutrons and fast neutrons to enter. The primary purpose of this facility is Ar-Ar dating and K-Ar dating via neutron activation.

The Cadmium-Lined Outer-Core Irradiation Tube (or CLOCIT) is a vacuum-filled irradiation facility occupying a fuel slot in one of the outer rings of the core. Its purpose is similar to the CLICIT, however due to its location, irradiations take 1.8 times longer than the CLICIT.

The In-Core Irradiation Tube (or ICIT) is located in the same ring as the CLOCIT and is the highest neutron flux facility offered at OSTR. It is similar to the CLICIT and CLOCIT but it lacks Cadmium lining, resulting in unfiltered neutron irradiation.

The Rotating Rack, colloquially known as the Lazy Susan, is a ring surrounding the core between the core and the graphite neutron reflector. It rotates around the core about once a minute, providing an even flux to the samples inside. This facility has 40 nitrogen-filled slots for samples to be irradiated in.

The primary purpose of this facility is perform neutron activation analysis on isotopes with short half-lives.

The Central Thimble is a water-filled tube extending down the central position of the core. Its purpose is to provide the highest flux available in the core; however, it is currently not in use at OSTR.

Safety
Oregon Department of Energy has coordinated the HAZMAT Radiological Training Courses at the center for HAZMAT response teams throughout the state of Oregon for the last 15 years.
Further, instead of only having a Public Safety force on campus and/or local Police, OSU's primary security force are Oregon State Police.

Forensic analysis
The reactor has also used Neutron activation analysis to help with the forensic analysis in a high-profile serial killer case (the I-5 Bandit) and several other cases.

Research
The following are some ongoing projects in conjunction with the reactor:

 Neutron activation analysis
 Radiotracer techniques
 Medical isotope development and production
 Geological age dating
 Neutron radiography
 Thermal hydraulics of nuclear steam systems
 Radiation sterilization
 Radiation dosimeter testing
 Boron Neutron Capture Therapy
 Radiochemical methodologies

References

External links
OSU Radiation Center (official site)
OSU Nuclear Engineering and Radiation Health Physics
ABC's Radioactive Roadtrip Security Review

 

Oregon State University buildings
Nuclear reactors
Nuclear research reactors